Steven Yancy Piñeiro (born November 17, 1996) is a Puerto Rican professional skateboarder. He grew up in the Puerto Rican diaspora in Connecticut, New York and Florida (Jacksonville and Orlando) and repatriated to Puerto Rico in 2019. His family is entirely of Puerto Rican descent from the municipality of Toa Baja; his father Steven Piñeiro was born in New York and his mother Elizabeth Pagán was born in Puerto Rico. He is the third child of four siblings. He has competed globally since the age of 12 in skateboarding event. In 2019, he repatriated to his family’s hometown Toa Baja, Puerto Rico where he chose to represent Puerto Rico in sporting events moving forward out of a deep love and admiration for his island, it’s culture and people.

In 2011, when he was 14-year-old, Piñeiro traveled to Australia to participate in Bowl-A-Rama. The day before the event, he broke his wrist while attempting a 7-foot 540. The incident was shown on Season 6, Episode 10 of Bondi Rescue.

In 2019 while representing Puerto Rico he won the silver medal at the World Beach Games in Doha, Qatar.

He is set to compete in the men's park event at the 2021 Tokyo Olympics.

References 

Living people
1996 births
Puerto Rican skateboarders
Olympic skateboarders of Puerto Rico
Skateboarders at the 2020 Summer Olympics
Sportspeople from New London, Connecticut